Sadochismo is the second studio album by German pornogrind band Cock and Ball Torture. It features their most popular track "Aphrodisianus".

Track listing

References

External links

2002 albums
Cock and Ball Torture (band) albums